The Canton of Baugy is a former canton in the Cher département and in the Centre region of France. It was disbanded following the French canton reorganisation effective in March 2015. It consisted of 17 communes, which joined the canton of Avord in 2015. It had 11,526 inhabitants in 2012.

Geography
A farming area in the arrondissement of Bourges. centred on the town of Baugy.

The canton comprised 17 communes:

Avord
Baugy
Bengy-sur-Craon
Chassy
Crosses
Farges-en-Septaine
Gron
Jussy-Champagne
Laverdines
Moulins-sur-Yèvre
Nohant-en-Goût
Osmoy
Saligny-le-Vif
Savigny-en-Septaine
Villabon
Villequiers
Vornay

Population

See also
 Arrondissements of the Cher department
 Cantons of the Cher department
 Communes of the Cher department

References

Baugy
2015 disestablishments in France
States and territories disestablished in 2015